Girl in Blue is a 2001 novel by Ann Rinaldi. It is a historical fiction that takes place during 1861, during the American Civil War.

Plot
16-year-old Sarah Louisa Wheelock lives on a farm near a small village in Michigan in the 1860s. Her abusive father wants her to marry an abusive neighbor who has several children. Instead, she runs away to Flint, Michigan to stay with an aunt, and then ships out with the First Union Greys to fight in the Civil War as a man. She ends up working in a hospital as a gopher. She fights in the first Bull Run. After she is discovered to be a girl, she continues to work for the Union-spying on Rose O'Neal Greenhow.

Reception
This novel takes many of its plot points from the life of Sarah Emma Edmonds.

References

2001 American novels
Novels by Ann Rinaldi
Novels set during the American Civil War
Fiction set in 1861
American historical novels
Novels set in the 1860s